Events in the year 2020 in the Czech Republic.

Incumbents
 President – Miloš Zeman
 Prime Minister – Andrej Babiš

Events

Planned: the 2020 Czech regional elections will be held in 13 regions.

8 August 2020 - A fire incident in an apartment in Bohumin killed at least 11 people and further leaving 10 others injured.

Deaths
  

9 January – 
Ivan Passer, film director and screenwriter (b. 1933).
Karel Saitl, weightlifter (b. 1924).
14 January – Naděžda Kniplová, operatic soprano (b. 1932).
15 January – Bruno Nettl, Czech-born American ethnomusicologist and musicologist (b. 1930).
18 January – Petr Pokorný, Protestant theologian (b. 1933). 
20 January – Jaroslav Kubera, politician, President of the Senate (b. 1947).

27 July – Jan Skopeček, actor and playwright (b. 1925).

3 August – Hana Krampolová, actress (b. 1961).
4 August – Irena Sedlecká, sculptor (b. 1928).

References

 
2020s in the Czech Republic
Years of the 21st century in the Czech Republic
Czech Republic
Czech Republic